= British Library Ediciones Vigía Collection =

The British Library Ediciones Vigía Collection is a collection of printed materials from Ediciones Vigía in Cuba. Ediciones Vigía was founded in April 1985 in Matanzas and its name was taken from its location in the Plaza de la Vigía (Watchtower Square). The group produce short runs of books, magazines, loose sheets and scrolls with hand coloured illustrations.
